Mortuus Machina is the second album by Australian Metal band Universum. This album features guest contributions from many high profile musicians within the melodic death metal subgenre, including Christian Älvestam (Miseration, Solution .45, ex-Scar Symmetry), Ola Frenning (ex-Soilwork), Tommy Tuovinen (MyGRAIN), Marios Iliopoulos (Nightrage), Olof Mörck (Amaranthe), and Paul Wardingham.

Track listing
All music written by Michael Soininen except where noted

Personnel

Universum
 Adam Soininen - vocals
 Michael Soininen - lead/rhythm guitar, additional vocals
 Stephen Murphy - rhythm/lead guitar
 Rachael Madden - keyboards
 Jaron Soininen - drums 
 Doug Clark - bass

Production
 Stephen Murphy - Producer & Recording Engineer
 Jens Bogren- Mixing/Mastering

References

External links
 Official Website
 MySpace Website
 YouTube Website

2011 albums
Universum (band) albums